German submarine U-3520 was a Type XXI U-boat (one of the "Elektroboote") of Nazi Germany's Kriegsmarine, built for service in World War II. She was ordered on 6 November 1943, and was laid down on 20 September 1944 at F Schichau GmbH, Danzig, as yard number 1665. She was launched on 23 November 1944, and commissioned under the command of Kapitänleutnant Sarto Ballert on 12 January 1945.

Design
Like all Type XXI U-boats, U-3520 had a displacement of  when at the surface and  while submerged. The submarine was powered by two MAN SE supercharged six-cylinder M6V40/46KBB diesel engines each providing , two Siemens-Schuckert GU365/30 double-acting electric motors each providing , and two Siemens-Schuckert silent running GV232/28 electric motors each providing .

U-3520 was fitted with six  torpedo tubes in the bow and four  C/30 anti-aircraft guns. She could carry twenty-three torpedoes or seventeen torpedoes and twelve mines. The complement was five officers and fifty-two men.

Fate
U-3520 was sunk by mines on 31 January 1945, northeast of Bülk, in the Baltic Sea. None of the crew of 85 survived.

References

Bibliography

External links
 

Type XXI submarines
U-boats commissioned in 1944
World War II submarines of Germany
1944 ships
Ships built in Danzig
Ships built by Schichau
U-boats sunk in 1945
Maritime incidents in January 1945